Millerovo is an air base in Millerovsky District, Rostov Oblast of the Russian Air Force as part of the 4th Air and Air Defence Forces Army, Southern Military District.

The base is home to the 31st Guards Fighter Aviation Regiment which has two squadrons of Sukhoi Su-30SM (NATO: Flanker-H)

The 368th Assault Aviation Regiment with Sukhoi Su-25's (NATO: Frogfoot) deployed here as part of the 2022 Russian invasion of Ukraine.

2022 attack

On 25 February 2022 reports began circulating, alongside an amateur video showing burning military installations, that Millerovo Airbase had been attacked and damaged by two Tochka-U ballistic missiles launched from Ukraine in response to the Russian invasion of Ukraine and to prevent Russian forces from using the airbase to provide air support to Russian troops in Ukraine. There has been no official confirmation from the Ukrainian or Russian armed forces regarding the attack on Millerovo air base.

References

Buildings and structures in Rostov Oblast
Russian Air Force bases